Luis Antonio Bolín Bidwell (1894 Málaga – 3  September 1969) was a Spanish lawyer, journalist and an expert in tour operating. This led to his appointment as Head of the National Union of Catering and Allied Attorney in Parliament during the first four legislatures of Francoist Spain. In his memoirs he simply uses the English orthography, Bolin.

Early life
Bolín was born into a well-to-do family of wine merchants, of Málaga, Spain in 1897. His mother was English. He studied at the universities of Granada and Madrid, and later in London.

Career
During World War I he worked in France at the British front as a war correspondent. In 1920 he was press attaché at the Spanish Embassy in London. He also became a correspondent for the conservative and pro-monarchy Spanish newspaper ABC and in 1921 he became a member of the information section of the League of Nations. He was an ardent monarchist and opposed the coming of the Spanish Republic in 1931, after the abdication of Alfonso XIII. He was even more alarmed by what he perceived as the revolutionary tendencies that started after the electoral success of the Popular Front in early 1936 and which he believed could not be controlled by the legal government.

Spanish Civil War
In July 1936, Bolín played an important role in the events leading up to the Spanish Civil War, when he organised the flight of a de Havilland Dragon Rapide aircraft from Croydon to the Canary Islands, in order to transport General Franco from the Canaries to Spanish Morocco. Franco arrived on July 19 in Tetuan to lead the insurrection and prepare the transport of the troops to the mainland. This was some days before the murder of Calvo Sotelo, that triggered the generals to start their rebellion earlier than foreseen, on July 18. Otherwise the rebellion would have come probably a few weeks later. The flight itself was planned over lunch at Simpson's-in-the-Strand, where Bolín met with Douglas Francis Jerrold, the conservative Roman Catholic editor of The English Review, and Major Hugh Pollard. Pollard contracted Captain Cecil Bebb as pilot, also taking his daughter Diana Pollard and one of her friends, to pose as tourists. 

Immediately thereafter Bolín flew to Rome, in order to request in name of general Franco the delivery of twelve bombers with and a sufficient number of bombs. At first Mussolini refused, because he did not have proof that this initiative was backed up by general Mola, to whom he had promised help in 1934. On July 25 Mussolini gave his permission to the delivery, after a consenting message from Mola. The bombers were necessary to break the blockade of the Moroccan waters by loyal Spanish war ships and enable Franco's troops to reach the mainland. Bolín was passenger of one of the nine bombers that reached Spanish Morocco safely. Two planes crashed and one made a forced landing in French Morocco.  

In return for his assistance, Bolín was appointed by Franco honorary Captain of the Spanish Foreign Legion. He also became Franco's chief press officer, and during the Civil War he was responsible for taking journalists on tours of the various battlefields. His fierce advocacy for Franco earned him the dislike of left-wing journalists. He harboured a particular hatred for Arthur Koestler and vowed that if he ever laid hands on him he would “shoot him like a dog”. After the fall of Málaga to Italian forces sent by Mussolini to support Franco’s rebellion, Koestler was sheltering with Sir Peter Chalmers Mitchell, a 72 year old retired zoologist (and driving force behind Whipsnade Zoo) who had also provided safe haven to Bolín’s own uncle and aunt and their five daughters during the early months of the rebellion. Bolín arrested them both. While Sir Peter was quickly released thanks to his diplomatic connections, Koestler languished for several months in a fascist prison under sentence of death. The episode is recorded both in Sir Peter’s memoirs  and in Koestler’s Spanish Testament. Bolín's efforts during the Civil War could not outdo the clever propaganda of the Republican Government, which he claimed had generally a much better hearing in the western media only because the Rebels had no telephone facilities so that messages from journalists working in their territory reached the western world much later.

Later life
In 1967 he published his memoirs, Spain, the Vital Years. He died in 1969.

References

External links
Photograph and brief biography of Bolin Retrieved 10 July 2012

People from Málaga
1894 births
1969 deaths
Spanish people of Swedish descent
Spanish expatriates in the United Kingdom